Trifolium howellii is a species of clover known by the common names canyon clover and Howell's clover. It is native to Oregon and California, where it grows in moist and shady habitat types, such as swamps and forest streambanks.

Description
It is a perennial herb growing erect with hairless herbage. The leaf blades are made up of large oval leaflets each measuring up to 10 centimeters long, and large stipules which may be over 2 centimeters long.

The inflorescence is a round or elongated head of flowers up to 3 centimeters long, the flowers spreading out and drooping with age. Each flower has a greenish or pinkish corolla measuring one centimeter long or more.

References

External links
Jepson Manual Treatment
Photo gallery

howellii
Flora of California
Flora of Oregon
Flora of the Klamath Mountains
Natural history of the California Coast Ranges
Flora without expected TNC conservation status